Grevillea saxicola is a species of flowering plant in the family Proteaceae and is endemic to the Pilbara region of Western Australia. It is a shrub or small tree usually with pinnatisect leaves with linear lobes, and cylindrical clusters of cream-coloured to pale yellow flowers.

Description

Taxonomy
Grevillea saxicola was first formally described in 2014 by Stephen J. Dillon in the journal Nuytsia from specimens collected near Tom Price in 2012. The specific epithet (saxicola) means "a dweller among rocks".

Distribution and habitat
This grevillea occurs in the arid Pilbara shrublands bioregion of Western Australia, from 40 km east of Paraburdoo to 50 km west-north-west of Newman. It grows on the orange-red-brown loam soils of scree slopes and ridges of banded iron formations, as well as in mulga woodlands.

Conservation status
Grevillea saxicola is listed as "Priority Three" by the Government of Western Australia Department of Biodiversity, Conservation and Attractions, meaning that it is poorly known and known from only a few locations but is not under imminent threat.

References

saxicola
Proteales of Australia
Endemic flora of Australia
Eudicots of Western Australia
Plants described in 2014